The Chris Neessen House is a historic building located in Wellsburg, Iowa, United States. Christopher Neessen (1864–1944) immigrated from Germany in 1880 and became a farmer, land owner, and local banker. He hired Waterloo, Iowa architect Howard Bowman Burr to design this Prairie School house that was completed in 1916. The garage was built to the northeast of the house the following year. They were constructed by local builder Mylon Alexander Rohrbacher. The two-story brick house follows an irregular plan and measures . It is located on an elevated corner lot. The house was listed on the National Register of Historic Places in 1984.

References

Houses completed in 1916
Buildings and structures in Grundy County, Iowa
Houses on the National Register of Historic Places in Iowa
Prairie School architecture in Iowa
National Register of Historic Places in Grundy County, Iowa